The 2019–20 Idaho State Bengals men's basketball team represents Idaho State University during the 2019–20 NCAA Division I men's basketball season. The Bengals, led by first-year head coach Ryan Looney, play their home games at Reed Gym in Pocatello, Idaho as members of the Big Sky Conference.

Previous season
The Bengals finished the 2018–19 season 11–19, 7–13 in Big Sky play to finish in 11th place. They lost in the first round of the Big Sky tournament to Southern Utah.

On March 26, Idaho State decided to not renew the contract of head coach Bill Evans. He finished at Idaho State with a seven-year record of 70–141.

Roster

Schedule and results

|-
!colspan=9 style=| Exhibition

|-
!colspan=9 style=| Non-conference regular season

|-
!colspan=9 style=| Big Sky regular season

|-
!colspan=9 style=| Big Sky tournament

References

Idaho State Bengals men's basketball seasons
Idaho State
IIdaho
IIdaho